George Motoi (22 January 1936 – 4 March 2015) was a Romanian actor. He appeared in more than thirty films from 1962 to 2005.

Selected filmography

References

External links 

1936 births
2015 deaths
Romanian male film actors